Mrs. Piss is a collaborative project consisting of American musicians Chelsea Wolfe and Jess Gowrie.

History
Mrs. Piss played together in a band called Red Host in the early 2000s. The duo started the project while touring around Wolfe's 2017 album Hiss Spun. Wolfe said "Working on this project brought Jess and I so much closer as songwriters and production partners, after reuniting as friends and bandmates."

Mrs. Piss released their debut album Self-Surgery on May 29, 2020. They shared two singles from the album. Downer Surrounded by Uppers and Knelt, on May 14.

Members
 Chelsea Wolfe – guitar, vocals
 Jess Gowrie – drums, guitar, bass, programming

Discography

Studio albums
 Self-Surgery (2020)

References

Musical groups established in 2017
American musical duos
2017 establishments in the United States